George A. Murphy (March 16, 1923 – August 11, 2015) was an American lawyer and politician from New York.

Life
Murphy was born on March 16, 1923, in Brooklyn, New York City. He attended Merrick Grammar School and Wellington C. Mepham High School. He graduated B.S. from Fordham University, and from St. John's University School of Law. He practiced law in Seaford, Nassau County, and entered politics as a Republican. In 1952, he married Theresa, and they had ten children.

On November 2, 1971, Murphy was elected to the New York State Senate (4th D.), to fill the vacancy caused by the death of Edward J. Speno, and took his seat in the 179th New York State Legislature during the special session in December 1971. In November 1972, after re-apportionment, Murphy was nominated for election in the 12th State Assembly District.

Murphy was a member of the New York State Assembly from 1973 to 1978, sitting in the 180th, 181st and 182nd New York State Legislatures. In November 1978, he was elected to the New York Supreme Court.

Murphy died from complications of a stroke on August 11, 2015, and was buried at the Long Island National Cemetery.

Nassau County District Court Judge Terence Murphy (born 1956) is his son.

References

1923 births
2015 deaths
People from Seaford, New York
Republican Party members of the New York State Assembly
Republican Party New York (state) state senators
Fordham University alumni
St. John's University School of Law alumni
New York Supreme Court Justices
20th-century American judges